The Lake Wedington Historic District (locally Lake Wedington, sometimes spelled incorrectly Lake Weddington) is a US Historic District in Washington County, Arkansas. The  historic district is located within the  Lake Wedington Recreation Area.

Facilities
Surrounding the  Lake Wedington are 18 family campsites and 19 family picnic sites, built by the Works Progress Administration in 1938. The area also contains six modernized cabins for overnight visitors, complete with air conditioning. A  hiking trail is available year-round. Further amenities include volleyball courts, playgrounds, horseshoes, a boat ramp and boathouse.

References

Geography of Washington County, Arkansas
Wedington
Historic districts on the National Register of Historic Places in Arkansas
National Register of Historic Places in Washington County, Arkansas
Works Progress Administration in Arkansas
Campgrounds in the United States